Emily Crofford (born 1927) is an author of books for children.

Career
Crofford was born in 1927 in Lake Providence, Louisiana. Her children's book Born in the Year of Courage was released in September 1991 through Lerner Publishing Group. It is the true story of Nakahama Manjirō, a Japanese fisherman who was rescued by an American ship in the mid-19th-century. Reception for the book was mostly positive, with the School Library Journal praising the book.

References

American children's writers
1927 births
Living people